Chiara Bucciarelli-Ducci (born June 15, 1976) is an Italian cardiologist working in England.

Career
Bucciarelli-Ducci was born on June 15, 1976. She completed her general medical training and her specialist cardiology training at the Sapienza University in Rome, before taking on a doctorate at Imperial College London.
Formerly a senior lecturer at the University of Bristol and Co-Director of the Clinical Research and Imaging Centre Bristol, she was named the Chief Executive Officer of the Society for Cardiovascular Magnetic Resonance. Since September 2021, she works at the Royal Brompton and Harefield NHS Foundation Trust in London.

References

External links

Living people
British cardiologists
Women cardiologists
Academics of the University of Bristol
1976 births